The church of San Leone is a church of Rome in Prenestino-Labicano district, in via Prenestina. It is dedicated to the fifth-century pope, Pope Leo I.

History

The church was built by the architect Giuseppe Zander between 1950 and 1952.

It is the home of the parish, established 7 October 1952 by decree of the Cardinal Vicar Clemente Micara Tricesimo iam vertente. In addition it is also home since 1965 the title of cardinal "San Leone I".

The church was visited by Pope John Paul II 17 December 1989.

List of Cardinal Protectors
 Lorenz Jager (25 February 1965 – 7 April 1975)
 Roger Etchegaray (30 June 1979 – 24 June 1998)
 Karl Lehmann (21 February 2001 - 11 March 2018)
 Sergio Obeso Rivera (28 June 2018 – 11 August 2019)
 Cristóbal López Romero (5 October 2019 – present)

References

External links
 San Leone I

Titular churches
Roman Catholic churches completed in 1952
Rome Q. VII Prenestino-Labicano
20th-century Roman Catholic church buildings in Italy